Risa Ozaki is the defending champion, having won the event in 2013, but chose not to participate.

Miharu Imanishi won the title, defeating Stéphanie Foretz 6–4, 6–4 in the final.

Seeds

Main draw

Finals

Top half

Bottom half

References
 Main Draw

Challenger Banque Nationale de Granby
Challenger de Granby